Kappa Ursae Majoris (κ Ursae Majoris, abbreviated Kappa UMa, κ UMa) is a binary star in the constellation of Ursa Major. With a combined apparent magnitude of +3.60, the system is approximately 358 light-years from Earth.

The two components are designated Kappa Ursae Majoris A (officially named Alkaphrah , a traditional name of the system) and B.

Nomenclature 

κ Ursae Majoris (Latinised to Kappa Ursae Majoris) is the system's Bayer designation. The designations of the two components as Kappa Ursae Majoris A and B derives from the convention used by the Washington Multiplicity Catalog (WMC) for multiple star systems, and adopted by the International Astronomical Union (IAU).

The traditional name of the system is Alkafzah (corrupted to Alkaphrah or El Koprah), from the Arabic القفزة al-qafzah "the leap". (Cf. Alula Borealis and Alula Australis.) 

In 2016, the IAU organized a Working Group on Star Names (WGSN) to catalog and standardize proper names for stars. The WGSN decided to attribute proper names to individual stars rather than entire multiple systems. It approved the name Alkaphrah for the component Kappa Ursae Majoris A on 5 September 2017 and it is now so included in the List of IAU-approved Star Names.

Properties 

Both components of the binary star are white A-type main sequence dwarfs. They have apparent magnitudes of +4.2 and +4.5. The orbital period of the binary is 35.6 years (13,007.2 days), and the two stars are separated by 0.18 arcseconds.

References

A-type main-sequence stars
Circumstellar disks
Binary stars

Ursa Major (constellation)
Ursae Majoris, Kappa
Durchmusterung objects
Ursae Majoris, 12
077327
044471
3594
Alkaphrah